Alexander McDonald may refer to:
 Alexander McDonald (Royal Marines officer) (c. 1745–1821), early land owner in New South Wales
 Alexander McDonald (sculptor) (1784–1860), Scottish granite sculptor
 Alexander N. McDonald (1818–1885), businessman and political figure in Nova Scotia, Canada
 Alexander McDonald (Royal Navy assistant surgeon) (1819 – c. 1848), Assistant Surgeon of HMS Terror (1813) on Franklin's Lost Expedition 
 Alexander McDonald (American politician) (1832–1903), U.S. Senator from Arkansas
 A. B. McDonald (Alexander Beith McDonald, 1847–1915), Scottish architect
 Alexander McDonald (South Australian politician) (1849–1922), member of the South Australian House of Assembly
 Alexander McDonald (1845–1920), member of the Victorian Legislative Assembly
 Alec McDonald (politician), member of the Victorian Legislative Assembly
 Alexander McDonald (Canadian politician) (1876–1945), Canadian politician in the Legislative Assembly of British Columbia
Alexander Hugh McDonald (1908–1979), New Zealand classicist and ancient historian
 Alexander Hamilton McDonald (1919–1980), Canadian politician
 Sandy McDonald (Alexander McDonald, 1937–2016), Church of Scotland minister

See also
 Alexander MacDonald (disambiguation)
 Alex McDonald (disambiguation)
 Sandy McDonald (disambiguation)